Spencer Richard Lee (born October 14, 1998) is an American freestyle and folkstyle wrestler who competes at 57 kilograms (125 pounds). In freestyle, he was the 2019 US national champion and a three-time age-group world champion, once as a cadet and twice as a junior. As a folkstyle wrestler, Lee has won the James E. Sullivan Award and the Dan Hodge Trophy twice, as well as being a three-time NCAA Division I national champion and a two-time Big Ten Conference champion out of the University of Iowa. He was also the top-recruit as a high school wrestler at the time of his commitment. Lee is often considered one of the most dominant athletes in college athletics.

Folkstyle career

Background 
Lee was born in Denver, Colorado but grew up in Saegertown, Pennsylvania. He moved again to Murrysville, Pennsylvania, where he attended Franklin Regional High School.

High school 
In Lee's freshman year he ended the season undefeated with a record of 49–0 and a state title at 113 pounds. As a sophomore, he also ended the season with a similar 48–0 record and a state championship now at 120 pounds. As a junior in high school, he also competed at 120 pounds, posting a perfect 12–0 record and winning state again, making him a three-time PIAA champion. As a senior, he also stayed undefeated during regular-season, competing at 132 pounds and eventually 126 pounds. Going into the state finals, Lee was the pound for pound top-ranked high school wrestler and was undefeated, posting a 144–0 record in his high school career. At the finals, Lee faced the same wrestler he had beaten by technical fall at the previous year's state finals, and later Iowa teammate, Austin DeSanto. With Lee up 5–4, DeSanto secured a last-second takedown, winning 6–5 and pulling arguably the biggest upset in high school wrestling.

As the top recruit in the country, Lee had offers from many Division I colleges, and chose the University of Iowa.

College

2017–2018 
Lee chose not to redshirt his first year and competed as a true freshman instead. He had immediate success, posting a 14–1 record in the regular season. He placed third at the Big Ten Conference Championships and competed at the NCAA championships. At the national tournament, Lee looked dominant, winning by technical fall 18–0 in his first two bouts in less than six minutes combined. After that, he pinned both Big 12 champion Nick Piccininni and former NCAA champion Nathan Tomasello, reaching the finals. At the finals, he faced Nick Suriano, who had been undefeated in 2017–2018.  Lee defeated Suriano 5–1. This result earned him the NCAA championship at 125 pounds as a true freshman, the first for the University of Iowa since Lincoln McIlravy in 1993.

2018–2019 
Lee posted an overall record of 23–3, placed second at the Big Ten Championships and competed at the NCAA championships as a sophomore. At the Nationals, Lee was as dominant as the previous year, winning by technical fall (18-0) in his first bout, major decision (10-1) in the second, and fall in the third. In his next two bouts, he defeated three-time Big 12 champion Nick Piccininni and ACC runner-up Jack Mueller, winning the NCAA championship at 125 pounds. Lee outscored opponents 55–7 in five matches at the NCAA Championships.

2019–2020 
In his junior year, Lee had the option to take an Olympic redshirt, but chose instead to help Iowa to win an NCAA title, though he would still compete in freestyle. During regular season, he compiled a record of 15–0 with 14 bringing bonus points. At the Big Ten tournament, Lee dominated his way to the finals, winning by fall inside 3 minutes in his first bout and by technical superiority (19-3) in the semifinals, making his way to the final. In the final, Lee defeated second-ranked Devin Schroder of Purdue University, via major decision (16-2) and qualified for the NCAA championships. Lee was the #1 seed and a big favorite to win the championship, however, the tournament was cancelled due to the COVID-19 pandemic, making Lee and all the qualifiers unable to compete. Overall, Lee remained undefeated with a record of 18–0 through the season and outscored his opponents 234–18. Due to this, Lee received the prestigious Dan Hodge Trophy as the best collegiate wrestler of the season and was named Big Ten Wrestler of the Year. In April, Lee received the prestigious James E. Sullivan Award as the most outstanding athlete in the United States of America.

2020–2021 
In October 2020, the NCAA granted an extra year of eligibility to winter athletes due to the last season being cut short, giving Lee the possibility of becoming a four-time NCAA champion. During regular season, Lee racked up an undefeated 4–0 record, with all of his victories coming via fall in the first period. On February 8, it was announced that the Iowa Hawkeyes wrestling team had suspended all team related activities during regular season due to COVID-19 results. During post-season, Lee claimed his second back-to-back Big Ten Conference championship, earning a dominant technical fall over Devin Schroder in the finale. Afterwards, he was named the Big Ten Wrestler of the Year for the second straight time. At the NCAA championships, Lee continued his dominance and made his way to the finals with all of his four victories coming with high-scoring bonus points. In the finale, he faced the third seed from Arizona State Brandon Courtney, whom he was unable to get bonus points out off despite dominating him and not allowing him to score any points of his own, claiming his third NCAA title. Lee later revealed he had torn his left ACL eight days before the tournament to match a torn right ACL suffered in the second period of the 2019 NCAA final against Mueller, but competed anyway and was successful by dominating the opposition. After the season, Lee was named the Dan Hodge Trophy winner (shared with heavyweight Gable Steveson) for the second straight season.

2021–2022 
Lee continues to have a year left of eligibility, as granted by the NCAA, despite competing as a senior in the season prior. He was announced to be the first Sino Global Capital athlete under a NIL deal. He achieved a 3–0 record at the start of the season before being pulled out of it due to requiring surgery in both of his knees after recurring injuries, lending Lee eligibility to return next year.

2022-2023 
Matt Ramos of Purdue defeated Lee with a fall in the NCAA semifinals to end Lee’s collegiate career.

Freestyle career

Age-group 
Lee was a highly successful age-group wrestler. In 2013, he made the US Cadet World Team by winning the US National title, notably defeating eventual NCAA champion Austin O' Connor and eventual '14 Youth Olympic silver medalist Daton Fix, and went on to place seventh at the World Championships. In 2014, he once again made the US Cadet World Team and went on to dominate the opposition at the World Championships, tech'ing and pinning his way to becoming a Cadet World Champion. In 2015, Lee moved up from 50 kilograms to 54 kilograms for the US Cadet National Championships, however, he was stopped twice by Daton Fix, losing his chance at the spot.

After failing to make the team, the 16-year-old Lee went back to 50 kilograms and made the US Junior World Team, tech'ing every opponent at the World Team Trials. At the World Championships, Lee showed no struggle in the junior level, once again tech'ing his way to becoming now a Junior World Champion. In 2016, Lee started off by winning the US Open, followed up making his fourth US World Team and represented the US at the Junior World Championships once again. In his last age-group showdown, Lee dominated the field on his way to the finals, before facing Kurshid Parpiev from Kyrgyzstan. In the finale, Lee went a full six-minute match for the first time in the junior level, and was forced to dig deep as his opponent held the lead after the first round, but Lee was able to scored eleven points of his own against Parpiev's five in the second period to edge the gold medal and become a two-time Junior World Champion.

Senior level

2019 
After more than three years of inactivity in freestyle, with his last showdown coming from his gold medal performance at the '16 Junior World Championships, the 21-year-old Lee registered to make his senior level debut at the Senior Nationals in December. In his first three senior matches, Lee outscored his opponents 30–0, including a flawless victory over NCAA champion Darian Cruz, to advance to the semifinals, where he faced the freshly crowned Junior World Championship silver medalist Vito Arujau, and despite making it more competitive, Arujau scoring four points, he was also shut down by Lee's ability and surrendered to a 14–4 technical fall. In the finale, Lee faced NCAA champion and four-time Big Ten Conference Champion Nathan Tomasello, whom he was also able to defeat with a lopsided decision, claiming the US National Championship.

2020–2021 
The 2019 NCAA and US National champion, Lee was scheduled to compete at the US Olympic Team Trials on April 4 at State College, Pennsylvania. However, the event was postponed for 2021 along with the Summer Olympics due to the COVID-19 pandemic, leaving all the qualifiers unable to compete until the next year. In his only match of the year, Lee pinned four–time DI All-American Zach Sanders on November 1 at the HWC Open I.

After claiming his third NCAA title in March 20, 2021, Lee's participation at the rescheduled US Olympic Team Trials was put on doubt after he revealed he had torn his left ACL, leaving him with no properly functioning ACLs since his right one had already been torn earlier in his career. On March 26, Lee announced that he had taken the decision of withdrawing from the Olympic Trials in order to properly recover from his injuries.

Freestyle record

! colspan="7"| Senior Freestyle Matches
|-
!  Res.
!  Record
!  Opponent
!  Score
!  Date
!  Event
!  Location
|-
|Win
|6–0
|align=left| Zach Sanders
|style="font-size:88%"|Fall
|style="font-size:88%"|November 1, 2020
|style="font-size:88%"|HWC Showdown Open
|style="text-align:left;font-size:88%;"|
 Iowa City, Iowa
|-
! style=background:white colspan=7 |
|-
|Win
|5–0
|align=left| Nathan Tomasello
|style="font-size:88%"|8–2
|style="font-size:88%" rowspan=5|December 20–22, 2019
|style="font-size:88%" rowspan=5|2019 Senior Nationals - US Olympic Trials Qualifier
|style="text-align:left;font-size:88%;" rowspan=5|
 Fort Worth, Texas
|-
|Win
|4–0
|align=left| Vitali Arujau
|style="font-size:88%"|TF 14–4
|-
|Win
|3–0
|align=left| Darian Cruz
|style="font-size:88%"|TF 10–0
|-
|Win
|2–0
|align=left| Shane Kim
|style="font-size:88%"|TF 10–0
|-
|Win
|1–0
|align=left| Jacob Moran
|style="font-size:88%"|TF 10–0
|-

NCAA record 

! colspan="8"| NCAA Division I Record
|-
!  Res.
!  Record
!  Opponent
!  Score
!  Date
!  Event
|-
! style=background:lighgrey colspan=6 |Start of 2022–2023 Season (senior extra-year)
|-
! style=background:lighgrey colspan=6 |End of 2021–2022 Season (senior extra-year)
|-
|Win
|78–5
|align=left| Jakob Camacho
|style="font-size:88%"|6–1
|style="font-size:88%"|December 21, 2021
|style="font-size:88%"|North Carolina State - Iowa Dual	
|-
|Win
|77–5
|align=left| Jaret Lane 
|style="font-size:88%"|MD 8–0
|style="font-size:88%" rowspan=2|December 20, 2021
|style="font-size:88%"|Lehigh - Iowa Dual	
|-
|Win
|76–5
|align=left| Brock Bergelin 
|style="font-size:88%"|TF 17–0
|style="font-size:88%"|Central Michigan - Iowa Dual	
|-
! style=background:lighgrey colspan=6 |Start of 2021-2022 Season (senior extra-year)
|-
! style=background:lighgrey colspan=6 |End of 2020-2021 Season (senior year)
|-
! style=background:white colspan=6 |2021 NCAA Championships  at 125 lbs
|-
|Win
|75–5
|Brandon Courtney
|style="font-size:88%"|7–0
|style="font-size:88%" rowspan=5|March 18–20, 2021
|style="font-size:88%" rowspan=5|2021 NCAA Division I Wrestling Championships
|-
|Win
|74–5
|align=left| Drew Hildebrandt
|style="font-size:88%"|MD 11–0
|-
|Win
|73–5
|align=left| Devin Schroder
|style="font-size:88%"|MD 10–2
|-
|Win
|72–5
|align=left| Killian Cardinale
|style="font-size:88%"|MD 15–5
|-
|Win
|71–5
|align=left| Patrick McCormick
|style="font-size:88%"|TF 17–1
|-
! style=background:white colspan=6 |2021 Big Ten Conference  at 125 lbs
|-
|Win
|70–5
|align=left| Devin Schroder
|style="font-size:88%"|TF 21–3
|style="font-size:88%" rowspan=3|March 6–7, 2021
|style="font-size:88%" rowspan=3|2021 Big Ten Conference Championships
|-
|Win
|69–5
|align=left| Rayvon Foley
|style="font-size:88%"|Fall
|-
|Win
|68–5
|align=left| Dylan Ragusin
|style="font-size:88%"|TF 19–4
|-
|Win
|67–5
|align=left| Brady Koontz
|style="font-size:88%"|Fall
|style="font-size:88%"|February 7, 2021
|style="font-size:88%"|Iowa - Ohio State Dual
|-
|Win
|66–5
|align=left| Justin Cardani
|style="font-size:88%"|Fall
|style="font-size:88%"|January 31, 2021
|style="font-size:88%"|Iowa - Illinois Dual
|-
|Win
|65–5
|align=left| Patrick McKee 
|style="font-size:88%"|Fall
|style="font-size:88%"|January 22, 2021
|style="font-size:88%"|Iowa - Minnesota Dual
|-
|Win
|64–5
|align=left| Liam Cronin 
|style="font-size:88%"|Fall
|style="font-size:88%"|January 15, 2021
|style="font-size:88%"|Nebraska - Iowa Dual
|-
! style=background:lighgrey colspan=6 |Start of 2020-2021 Season (senior year)
|-
! style=background:lighgrey colspan=6 |End of 2019-2020 Season (junior year)
|-
! style=background:white colspan=6 |2020 Big Ten Conference  at 125 lbs
|-
|Win
|63–5
|align=left| Devin Schroder
|style="font-size:88%"|MD 16–2
|style="font-size:88%" rowspan=3|March 8, 2020
|style="font-size:88%" rowspan=3|2020 Big Ten Conference Championships
|-
|Win
|62–5
|align=left| Jack Medley
|style="font-size:88%"|TF 19–3
|-
|Win
|61–5
|align=left| Nicolas Aguilar
|style="font-size:88%"|Fall
|-
|Win
|60–5
|align=left| Nick Piccininni
|style="font-size:88%"|MD 12–3
|style="font-size:88%"|February 23, 2020
|style="font-size:88%"|Oklahoma State - Iowa Dual
|-
|Win
|59–5
|align=left| Forfeit 
|style="font-size:88%"|FF
|style="font-size:88%"|February 15, 2020
|style="font-size:88%"|Minnesota - Iowa Dual
|-
|Win
|58–5
|align=left| Jack Medley
|style="font-size:88%"|8–1
|style="font-size:88%"|February 8, 2020
|style="font-size:88%"|Iowa - Michigan Dual
|-
|Win
|57–5
|align=left| Logan Griffin
|style="font-size:88%"|Fall
|style="font-size:88%"|February 2, 2020
|style="font-size:88%"|Iowa - Michigan State Dual
|-
|Win
|56–5
|align=left| Brandon Meredith
|style="font-size:88%"|TF 16–1
|style="font-size:88%"|January 31, 2020
|style="font-size:88%"|Penn State - Iowa Dual
|-
|Win
|55–5
|align=left| Hunter Lucas
|style="font-size:88%"|TF 18–0
|style="font-size:88%"|January 24, 2020
|style="font-size:88%"|Ohio State - Iowa Dual
|-
|Win
|54–5
|align=left| Alex Thomsen
|style="font-size:88%"|TF 18–0
|style="font-size:88%"|January 18, 2020
|style="font-size:88%"|Nebraska - Iowa Dual
|-
|Win
|53–5
|align=left| Devin Schroder
|style="font-size:88%"|TF 15–0
|style="font-size:88%"|January 12, 2020
|style="font-size:88%"|Iowa - Purdue Dual
|-
|Win
|52–5
|align=left| Liam Cronin
|style="font-size:88%"|TF 15–0
|style="font-size:88%"|January 10, 2020
|style="font-size:88%"|Iowa - Indiana Dual
|-
! style=background:white colspan=6 |2019 Midlands Championships 5th at 125 lbs
|-
|Win
|51–5
|align=left| Connor Ryan
|style="font-size:88%"|Fall
|style="font-size:88%" rowspan=3|December 29, 2019
|style="font-size:88%" rowspan=3|2019 Mindlands Invitational Championships
|-
|Win
|50–5
|align=left| Christian Moody
|style="font-size:88%"|Fall
|-
|Win
|49–5
|align=left| Liam Cronin
|style="font-size:88%"|Fall
|-
|Win
|48–5
|align=left| Michael Cullen
|style="font-size:88%"|TF 16–0
|style="font-size:88%"|December 1, 2019
|style="font-size:88%"|Wisconsin - Iowa Dual
|-
|Win
|47–5
|align=left|Alex Mackall
|style="font-size:88%"|TF 17–2
|style="font-size:88%"|November 24, 2019
|style="font-size:88%"|Iowa - Iowa State Dual
|-
|Win
|46–5
|align=left| Fabian Gutierrez
|style="font-size:88%"|MD 16–5
|style="font-size:88%"|November 17, 2019
|style="font-size:88%"|Chattanooga - Iowa Dual
|-
! style=background:lighgrey colspan=6 |Start of 2019-2020 Season (junior year)
|-
! style=background:lighgrey colspan=6 |End of 2018-2019 Season (sophomore year)
|-
! style=background:white colspan=6 |2019 NCAA Championships  at 125 lbs
|-
|Win
|45–5
|align=left|Jack Mueller
|style="font-size:88%"|5–0
|style="font-size:88%" rowspan=5|March 23, 2019
|style="font-size:88%" rowspan=5|2019 NCAA Division I Wrestling Championships
|-
|Win
|44–5
|align=left|Nick Piccininni
|style="font-size:88%"|11–4
|-
|Win
|43–5
|align=left|Sean Russell
|style="font-size:88%"|Fall
|-
|Win
|42–5
|align=left|Sean Fausz
|style="font-size:88%"|MD 10–1
|-
|Win
|41–5
|align=left|Bryce West
|style="font-size:88%"|TF 18–0
|-
! style=background:white colspan=6 |2019 Big Ten Conference  at 125 lbs
|-
|Loss
|40–5
|align=left|Sebastian Rivera
|style="font-size:88%"|4–6
|style="font-size:88%" rowspan=3|Mar 10, 2019
|style="font-size:88%" rowspan=3|2019 Big Ten Championships
|-
|Win
|40–4
|align=left| Sean Russell
|style="font-size:88%"|MD 8–0
|-
|Win
|39–4
|align=left| Elijah Oliver
|style="font-size:88%"|Fall
|-
|Loss
|38–4
|align=left|Nick Piccininni
|style="font-size:88%"|Fall
|style="font-size:88%"|Feb 24, 2019
|style="font-size:88%"|Iowa - Oklahoma State Dual
|-
|Win
|38–3
|align=left|Ethan Rotondo
|style="font-size:88%"|Fall
|style="font-size:88%"|Feb 17, 2019
|style="font-size:88%"|Iowa - Wisconsin Dual
|-
|Win
|37–3
|align=left| Elijah Oliver
|style="font-size:88%"|Fall
|style="font-size:88%"|February 15, 2019
|style="font-size:88%"|Indiana - Iowa Dual
|-
|Win
|36–3
|align=left| Brandon Cray
|style="font-size:88%"|Fall
|style="font-size:88%"|February 8, 2019
|style="font-size:88%"|Maryland - Iowa Dual
|-
|Win
|35–3
|align=left| Zeke Moisey
|style="font-size:88%"|MD 18–4
|style="font-size:88%"|February 3, 2019
|style="font-size:88%"|Iowa - Nebraska Dual
|-
|Win
|34–3
|align=left| Travis Piotrowski
|style="font-size:88%"|Fall
|style="font-size:88%"|Jan 25, 2019
|style="font-size:88%"|Iowa - Illinois Dual
|-
|Win
|33–3
|align=left|Nick DeNora
|style="font-size:88%"|Fall
|style="font-size:88%"|January 18, 2019
|style="font-size:88%"|Rutgers - Iowa Dual
|-
|Win
|32–3
|align=left|Sean Russell
|style="font-size:88%"|4–0
|style="font-size:88%"|January 13, 2019
|style="font-size:88%"|Iowa - Minnesota Dual
|-
! style=background:white colspan=6 |2018 Midlands Championships  at 125 lbs
|-
|Loss
|31–3
|align=left|Sebastian Rivera
|style="font-size:88%"|3–7
|style="font-size:88%" rowspan=5|December 29, 2018
|style="font-size:88%" rowspan=5|2018 Mindlands Invitational Championships
|-
|Win
|31–2
|align=left| Pat Glory
|style="font-size:88%"|12–6
|-
|Win
|30–2
|align=left| Drew Hildebrandt
|style="font-size:88%"|TF 18–0
|-
|Win
|29–2
|align=left|Bryce West
|style="font-size:88%"|TF 17–0
|-
|Win
|28–2
|align=left|Malik Heinselman
|style="font-size:88%"|Fall
|-
|Win
|27–2
|align=left| Luke Resnick
|style="font-size:88%"|TF 15–0
|style="font-size:88%"|December 8, 2018
|style="font-size:88%"|Lehigh - Iowa Dual
|-
|Win
|26–2
|align=left|Alex Mackall
|style="font-size:88%"|MD 13–4
|style="font-size:88%"|December 1, 2018
|style="font-size:88%"|Iowa State - Iowa Dual
|-
|Win
|25–2
|align=left|Pat Glory
|style="font-size:88%"|TF 18–2
|style="font-size:88%"|November 16, 2018
|style="font-size:88%"|Princeton - Iowa Dual
|-
|Win
|24–2
|align=left|Alejandro Hernandez-Figueroa
|style="font-size:88%"|TF 18–0
|style="font-size:88%"|November 9, 2018
|style="font-size:88%"|Iowa - CSU Bakersfield Dual
|-
|Win
|23–2
|align=left|Tomas Gutierrez
|style="font-size:88%"|TF 16–0
|style="font-size:88%"|November 9, 2018
|style="font-size:88%"|Iowa - Kenn State Dual
|-
! style=background:lighgrey colspan=6 |Start of 2018-2019 Season (sophomore year)
|-
! style=background:lighgrey colspan=6 |End of 2017-2018 Season (freshman year)
|-
! style=background:white colspan=6 |2018 NCAA Championships  at 125 lbs
|-
|Win
|22–2
|align=left|Nick Suriano
|style="font-size:88%"|5–1
|style="font-size:88%" rowspan=5|March 17, 2018
|style="font-size:88%" rowspan=5|2018 NCAA Division I Wrestling Championships
|-
|Win
|21–2
|align=left|Nathan Tomasello
|style="font-size:88%"|Fall
|-
|Win
|20–2
|align=left|Nick Piccininni
|style="font-size:88%"|Fall
|-
|Win
|19–2
|align=left|Luke Welch
|style="font-size:88%"|TF 18–0
|-
|Win
|18–2
|align=left|Alonzo Allen
|style="font-size:88%"|TF 18–0
|-
! style=background:white colspan=6 |2018 Big Ten Conference  at 125 lbs
|-
|Win
|17–2
|align=left|Luke Welch
|style="font-size:88%"|TF 16–0
|style="font-size:88%" rowspan=4|Mar 3, 2018
|style="font-size:88%" rowspan=4|2018 Big Ten Championships
|-
|Win
|16–2
|align=left|Sebastian Rivera
|style="font-size:88%"|MD 12–0
|-
|Loss
|15–2
|align=left|Nathan Tomasello
|style="font-size:88%"|1–2
|-
|Win
|15–1
|align=left|Rayvon Foley
|style="font-size:88%"|Fall
|-
|Win
|14–1
|align=left|Sinjin Briggs
|style="font-size:88%"|Fall
|style="font-size:88%"|Feb 18, 2018
|style="font-size:88%"|Iowa - Iowa State Dual
|-
|Win
|13–1
|align=left|Carson Kuhn
|style="font-size:88%"|Fall
|style="font-size:88%"|Feb 10, 2018
|style="font-size:88%"|Iowa - Penn State Dual
|-
|Win
|12–1
|align=left|Sebastian Rivera
|style="font-size:88%"|7–4
|style="font-size:88%"|February 4, 2018
|style="font-size:88%"|Northwestern - Iowa Dual
|-
|Win
|11–1
|align=left| Ethan Lizak
|style="font-size:88%"|TF 15–0
|style="font-size:88%"|February 2, 2018
|style="font-size:88%"|Minnesota - Iowa Dual
|-
|Win
|10–1
|align=left| Drew Mattin
|style="font-size:88%"|TF 15–0
|style="font-size:88%"|Jan 27, 2018
|style="font-size:88%"|Michigan - Iowa Dual
|-
|Win
|9–1
|align=left|Nathan Tomasello
|style="font-size:88%"|3–2
|style="font-size:88%"|Jan 21, 2018
|style="font-size:88%"|Iowa - Ohio State Dual
|-
|Win
|8–1
|align=left|Nick Piccininni
|style="font-size:88%"|10–5
|style="font-size:88%"|January 14, 2018
|style="font-size:88%"|Oklahoma State - Iowa Dual
|-
|Win
|7–1
|align=left|Rayvon Foley
|style="font-size:88%"|Fall
|style="font-size:88%"|January 5, 2018
|style="font-size:88%"|Michigan State - Iowa Dual
|-
! style=background:white colspan=6 |2017 Midlands Championships 6th at 125 lbs
|-
|Loss
|6–1
|align=left|Ronnie Bresser
|style="font-size:88%"|1–3
|style="font-size:88%" rowspan=4|December 29, 2017
|style="font-size:88%" rowspan=4|2017 Midlands Invitational Championships
|-
|Win
|6–0
|align=left|Sean Russell
|style="font-size:88%"|TF 15–0
|-
|Win
|5–0
|align=left|Travis Piotrowski
|style="font-size:88%"|TF 17–2
|-
|Win
|4–0
|align=left|Killian Cardinale
|style="font-size:88%"|Fall
|-
! style=background:white colspan=6 |2017 UNI Open  at 125 lbs
|-
|Win
|3–0
|align=left|Skyler Petry
|style="font-size:88%"|Fall
|style="font-size:88%" rowspan=3|December 9, 2017
|style="font-size:88%" rowspan=3|2017 UNI Open Tournament
|-
|Win
|2–0
|align=left|Johnny Jimenez
|style="font-size:88%"|Fall
|-
|Win
|1–0
|align=left|Dack Punke
|style="font-size:88%"|TF 16–0
|-
! style=background:lighgrey colspan=6 |Start of 2017-2018 Season (freshman year)

Stats 

!  Season
!  Year
!  School
!  Rank
!  Weigh Class
!  Record
!  Win
!  Bonus
|-
|2023
|Senior++
|rowspan=6|University of Iowa
|
|rowspan=6|125
|
|
|
|-
|2022
|Senior+
|DNQ
|3–0
|100.00%
|66.67%
|-
|2021
|Senior
|#1 (1st)
|12–0
|100.00%
|91.67%
|-
|2020
|Junior
|#1 (COVID)
|18–0
|100.00%
|88.89%
|-
|2019
|Sophomore
|#3 (1st)
|23–3
|88.46%
|73.08%
|-
|2018
|Freshman
|#3 (1st)
|22–2
|91.67%
|75.00%
|-
|colspan=5 bgcolor="LIGHTGREY"|Career
|bgcolor="LIGHTGREY"|75–5
|bgcolor="LIGHTGREY"|93.75%
|bgcolor="LIGHTGREY"|80.00%

References

External links 
 

1998 births
Living people
American male sport wrestlers
Iowa Hawkeyes wrestlers
James E. Sullivan Award recipients
People from Crawford County, Pennsylvania
People from Murrysville, Pennsylvania
Sportspeople from Denver